Drone most commonly refers to:
 Drone (bee), a male bee, from an unfertilized egg
 Unmanned aerial vehicle or aerial drone
 Unmanned underwater vehicle or underwater drone

Drone, or The Drones may also refer to:

Film and television 
 Drones (2010 film), an American office comedy
 Drones (2013 film), an American war thriller directed by Rick Rosenthal
 Drone (2014 film), a Norwegian documentary film
 Drone (2017 film), a Canadian thriller film 
 "Drones" (Beavis and Butt-Head), 2011 episode
 "Drone" (Star Trek: Voyager), 1998 episode
 Drone, a humanoid assimilated by the Borg in Star Trek
 Drones, service robots in Silent Running (1972)

Literature
 Drone, a member of the Drones Club in P. G. Wodehouse's novels
 Drones, intelligent machines in the utopian society The Culture of Iain M. Banks

Music 
 Drone (music), a continuous note or chord

Genres 
 Drone metal, a musical style
 Drone music, a musical style

Instruments
 Drone (bagpipes)
 Drone zither
 Bladder fiddle or drone

Artists
 The Drones (Australian band)
 The Drones (English band)

Albums
 The Drones (EP), a 2001 EP by the Australian band Drones
 Drones (Muse album) (2015)
 Drones World Tour
 Drones (Robert Rich album) (1983)

Songs
 "Drone", 2018, by Alice in Chains from Rainier Fog
 "Drone", 2015, by Chastity Belt from Time to Go Home
 "Drones", 2004, by Fear Factory from Archetype
 "Drones", 2015, by Oh Hiroshima from In Silence We Yearn
 "Drones", 2006, by Rise Against from The Sufferer & the Witness

Other uses 
Drone (wrestler), Mexican
Drone, Georgia, a place in the US
 Drone, a fertile male ant
 Drones or yanme'e, a fictional species in the Covenant in Halo

See also
 Didgeridoo, sometimes called a dronepipe
 Drone strike